Tania Malheiros is a Brazilian journalist, who won an Esso Journalism Award in 1997 in the category of Scientific, Technological and Ecological Information.

References

Brazilian journalists
Living people
Year of birth missing (living people)
Place of birth missing (living people)